Azovibrio is a genus of bacteria from the order Rhodocyclales which belongs to the class of Betaproteobacteria, but the family to which it belongs is uncertain since it falls in between the Zoogloeaceae and the Rhodocyclaceae. Up to now there is only on species known (Azovibrio restrictus).

References

Bacteria genera
Monotypic bacteria genera
Rhodocyclales